Passerano Marmorito is a small rural comune (municipality) in the Province of Asti in the Italian region Piedmont, about  east of Turin and about  northwest of Asti.

Geography
The capoluogo of the commune, and the site of its town hall, is Passerano. The communal statute identifies three further villages or hamlets within the boundaries of the commune: Marmorito, Primeglio and Schierano (after which the wine grape Malvasia di Schierano is named). Further localities  include Boscorotondo, Serra and Rocco.

Passerano Marmorito borders the following municipalities: Albugnano, Aramengo, Capriglio, Castelnuovo Don Bosco, Cerreto d'Asti, Cocconato, Pino d'Asti, and Piovà Massaia.

Twin towns — sister cities
Passerano Marmorito is twinned with:

  Beauvoisin, Drôme, France (2011)

References

Cities and towns in Piedmont